Gratien Candace (December 18, 1873 in Baillif, Guadeloupe – April 11, 1953 in Lormaye, France) was a politician from Guadeloupe who served in the French Chamber of Deputies from 1912 to 1942 and served as vice-president of the French Chamber of Deputies from 1938 to 1940.  He retired from French politics in 1940, declining to become part of the Vichy regime.

Candace attended the First Pan-African Congress, Paris, February 19–22, 1919.

African-American historian and Pan-Africanist W. E. B. Du Bois faulted Candace harshly for a perceived lack of commitment to the interests of the African diaspora, writing "Candace is virulently French. He has no conception of Negro uplift, as apart from French development."

He earned a degree in science at the University of Toulouse and later taught as a professor and was a founder of the École nationale de la France d'Outre-Mer (ENFOM) and the Académie des Sciences Coloniales.

Further reading 
 1996–2001 : Dominique Chathuant, « L’assimilationnisme, une structure mentale », Cyril Serva (dir),  Études guadeloupéennes, Jasor, Pointe-à-Pitre, 2001, pp. 111–122 (version remaniée d’une communication au colloque « 50 ans de départementalisation », Université Antilles-Guyane (UAG), Fouillole, Pointe-à-Pitre, mars 1996).
 2003 : Dominique Chathuant, « Gratien Candace: une figure de la vie politique française. 1st partie: la Troisième République (1900–1940) », Bulletin de la Société d'histoire de la Guadeloupe, number 134, janvier-avril 2003, ISSN 0583-8266, pp. 27–103
 2004 : Béatrice De Pastre, "Cinéma éducateur et propagande coloniale à Paris au début des années 1930", Revue d'histoire moderne et contemporaine 2004-4 (numbers 51–4), ISSN 0048-8003, digital ISSN pending, pp. 135–151.
 2008 : Dominique Chathuant, « Gratien Candace: une figure de la vie politique française. 2nd partie: un vestige de la Troisième République (1940–1953)», Bulletin de la Société d'histoire de la Guadeloupe, number 148, ISSN 0583-8266, janvier 2008, pp. 3–131.
 2009 : Dominique Chathuant, « Une élite politique noire dans la France du premier Vingtième siècle », Vingtième siècle. Revue d’histoire, number 101, janvier-mars 2009, Presses de Sciences Po, ISSN 0294-1759, pp. 133–148.
 2009 : Melvyn Stokes, "Kojo Touvalou Houénou: An Assessment", Transatlantica.
 2010 : Dominique Chathuant, « Gratien Candace, candidat (1914–1945) », L. Jalabert, B. Joly, J. Weber (dir), Les élections législatives et sénatoriales outre-mer (1848–1981), Actes du colloque 2006 de l’université de Nantes, CRHIA, Les Indes savantes, 2010, pp. 103–115.
 2010 : Dominique Chathuant, « Français de couleur contre métèques : les députés coloniaux contre le préjugé racial (1919–1939) », Outre-mers. Revue d’histoire (ex. RFHOM), Vol. 98, numbers 366–367, ISSN 1631-0438, 1st sem. 2010, pp. 239–253.
 2011 : Dominique Chathuant, « Entre gauches et droites, entre Paris et Guadeloupe: polémiques autour du conflit italo-éthiopien (1935) », Bulletin de la Société d'histoire de la Guadeloupe, number 160, sept.-déc. 2011, pp. 40–56.
2021 : "Gratien Candace, 1873-1953: In the Name of the Empire", in Josep M. Fradera, José María Portillo, Teresa Segura Garcia (ed.), Unexpected Voices in Imperial Parliaments, London, Bloomsbury Academic, "Empire's Other Histories" series, 2021, 256 p..
 2021 : Dominique Chathuant, Nous qui ne cultivons pas le préjugé de race. Histoire(s) d'un siècle de doute sur le racisme en France'', Paris, Le Félin, 2021, 504 p. .

Image gallery

References

External links
 
 

1873 births
1953 deaths
People from Baillif
Guadeloupean politicians
Republican-Socialist Party politicians
Independent Radical politicians
Members of the 10th Chamber of Deputies of the French Third Republic
Members of the 11th Chamber of Deputies of the French Third Republic
Members of the 12th Chamber of Deputies of the French Third Republic
Members of the 13th Chamber of Deputies of the French Third Republic
Members of the 14th Chamber of Deputies of the French Third Republic
Members of the 15th Chamber of Deputies of the French Third Republic
Members of the 16th Chamber of Deputies of the French Third Republic